Khorkhorino is a rural locality (a village) in Yudinskoye Rural Settlement, Velikoustyugsky District, Vologda Oblast, Russia. The population was 67 as of 2002. There are 7 streets.

Geography 
Khorkhorino is located 8 km northwest of Veliky Ustyug (the district's administrative centre) by road. Zolotavtsevo is the nearest rural locality.

References 

Rural localities in Velikoustyugsky District